This is a list of universities in Bosnia and Herzegovina.

Public
List of public universities that are funded through the budgets of Government of the Federation of Bosnia and Herzegovina and Government of Republika Srpska. Also, there is information about the number of enrolled students as of 2018–19 school year.

Private (including standalone faculties and high colleges)
 Banja Luka College (Banja Luka)
 Banja Luka College of Communications Kappa Phi (Banja Luka)
European University, Brčko District, Brčko District
 High college CEPS-Center for Business Studies (Kiseljak)
 High college for applied and law sciences "Prometej" (Banja Luka)
 High college for business management "PRIMUS" (Gradiška)
 International Burch University (Sarajevo)
 International University of Goražde (Goražde)
 International University of Sarajevo (Sarajevo)
 University of Travnik (Travnik)
 Paneuropean University ApeiroN (Banja Luka)
 Sarajevo School of Science and Technology (Sarajevo)
 Slobomir P University (Doboj and Bijeljina)
 University College of Prijedor (Prijedor)
 University of Herzegovina (Medjugorje and Mostar)
 University of Modern Sciences - CKM (Mostar, Bosnia and Herzegovina)
 University of Vitez (Travnik)
 University Sinergija (Bijeljina)
 University of Business Engineering and Management (Banja Luka)

References 

Universities
Bosnia and Herzegovina

Bosnia